Hank is a 1965 American television sitcom that starred Dick Kallman in the title role. The show is a notable early example of a program with a true series finale, in which the underlying premise of the series reaches a natural conclusion with its final episode.

Synopsis
The show, which aired on NBC in 1965, revolves around a pair of orphans. In both the unaired pilot and first episode, Hank Dearborn is explained to be a teenager left to raise his young sister, Tina, after their parents die in a car crash.

Seeing that the best route to success is through higher education, Hank attempts to illegally audit classes at the fictional Western State University, while at the same time taking a variety of odd jobs, including running his own lunch truck on campus, to financially support what remains of his family. Hank's attempt to accomplish these two goals provides much of the show's humor, as he must engage in identity theft, impersonating various students when they are absent from class, and helped by sympathetic Professor McKillup, who has access to the student roll. Much of the drama arises from Hank's fear of his sister being forced into foster care.

Hank's life is further complicated because he is dating Doris Royal, the daughter of the university's registrar, Dr. Lewis Royal, who is on the lookout for unregistered students like Hank.  Typical episodes show Hank narrowly avoiding detection as an impersonator. In the final episode, his true identity is compromised. Because of his excellent performance on a recent exam, though, the university rewards him with a full academic scholarship and formal admittance to the university.

The series ends with his sister remarking, "There goes my brother – the registered student."

Cast
Dick Kallman as Hank Dearborn
Linda Foster as Doris Royal
Howard St. John as Dr. Lewis Royal
Dabbs Greer as Coach Ossie Weiss
Lloyd Corrigan as Professor McKillup
Katie Sweet as Tina Dearborn

Episode list

Home media
On November 3, 2015, Warner Bros. released Hank: The Complete Series on DVD via their Warner Archive Collection. This is a manufacture-on-demand release, available through Warner's online store and Amazon.com.

References

External links
 

1965 American television series debuts
1966 American television series endings
1960s American sitcoms
English-language television shows
NBC original programming
Television series by Warner Bros. Television Studios
1960s American college television series
Orphans in fiction
Identity theft in popular culture